There have been four baronetcies created for persons with the surname Temple, two in the Baronetage of England, one in the Baronetage of Nova Scotia and one in the Baronetage of the United Kingdom.

The Temple Baronetcy, of Stowe in the County of Buckingham, was created in the Baronetage of England on 24 September 1611. For more information on this creation, see the Viscount Cobham.

The Temple Baronetcy was created in the Baronetage of Nova Scotia on 7 July 1662 for the colonial administrator Thomas Temple. He was a grandson of the first Baronet of the 1611 creation. The title became extinct on his death in 1674.

The Temple Baronetcy, of Sheen in the County of Surrey, was created in the Baronetage of England on 31 January 1666 for the politician William Temple. The title became extinct on his death in 1699.

The Temple Baronetcy, of The Nash in Kempsey in the County of Worcester, was created in the Baronetage of the United Kingdom on 16 August 1876 for the politician and colonial administrator Richard Temple. This family descends from William Dicken, who in 1740 married Henrietta, daughter and co-heir of the fifth Baronet of the 1611 creation. Their son assumed by Royal licence the surname of Temple in lieu of Dicken in 1796. His grandson was the first Baronet.

Temple baronets, of Stowe (1611)

Sir Thomas Temple, 1st Baronet, of Stowe (1567–1637)
 Sir Peter Temple, 2nd Baronet (1592–1653): MP for Buckingham in both the Short Parliament and the Long Parliament
 Sir Richard Temple, 3rd Baronet (1634–1697): MP for Warwickshire and Buckingham
His son (Richard, 4th Baronet) became 1st Viscount Cobham – see the Viscount Cobham
Sir William Temple, 5th Baronet (1694–1760)
Sir Peter Temple, 6th Baronet (died 1761)
Sir Richard Temple, 7th Baronet (1731–1786) (dormant)
 Baronetcy claimed by the self-styled Sir John Temple, 8th Baronet, but not universally acknowledged

Temple baronets (1662)
Sir Thomas Temple, 1st Baronet (1614–1674)

Temple baronets, of Sheen (1666)

Sir William Temple, 1st Baronet (1628–1699)

Temple baronets, of The Nash (1876)

Sir Richard Temple, 1st Baronet (1826–1902) m. Louisa, dau. of James Rivett-Carnac governor of Bombay (1838-1841)
Sir Richard Carnac Temple, 2nd Baronet (1850–1931) m. 1880, Agnes, dau. of Maj.-Gen. George Archimedes Searle
Sir Richard Durand Temple, 3rd Baronet (1880–1962) m. 1st, 1912, Katherine Marjorie, dau. of Frederic de la Fontaine Williams, of Rydes Hill House; m. 2nd, 1939, Marie Wanda, dau. of John Frederick Christian Henderson, and was succeeded by his son by his first wife:
Sir Richard Anthony Purbeck Temple, 4th Baronet (1913–2007) m. 1936 (div. 1946), Lucy Geils, dau. of Alain Joly de Lotbinière, 8th Seigneur de Lotbinière, of Pointe Platon, Quebec, Canada; m. 2nd, 1950, Jean, dau. of James Thompson Finnie, and was succeeded by his elder son by his first wife:
Sir Richard Chartier Carnac Temple, 5th Baronet (born 1937) m. 1964, Emma Rose, dau. of Maj.-Gen. Sir Robert Laycock by his wife Lady Clare Angela Louise, dau. of William Dudley Ward, M.P.; issue three daughters.

References

Kidd, Charles, Williamson, David (editors). Debrett's Peerage and Baronetage (1990 edition). New York: St Martin's Press, 1990.

 

1611 establishments in England